

Events

Pre-1600
 959 – Eraclus becomes the 25th bishop of Liège.
1140 – Song dynasty general Yue Fei defeats an army led by Jin dynasty general Wuzhu at the Battle of Yancheng during the Jin–Song Wars.
1169 – Battle of the Blacks: Uprising by the black African forces of the Fatimid army, along with a number of Egyptian emirs and commoners, against Saladin. The uprising is defeated after two days, consolidating Saladin's position as master of Egypt.
1192 – Minamoto no Yoritomo becomes Sei-i Taishōgun and the de facto ruler of Japan. (Traditional Japanese date: the 12th day of the seventh month in the third year of the Kenkyū (建久) era).
1331 – King Stefan Uroš III, after months of anarchy, surrenders to his son and rival Stefan Dušan, who succeeds as King of Serbia.
1415 – Henry the Navigator leads Portuguese forces to victory over the Marinids at the Conquest of Ceuta.

1601–1900
1680 – Pueblo Indians capture Santa Fe from the Spanish during the Pueblo Revolt.
1689 – The Battle of Dunkeld in Scotland.
1716 – Seventh Ottoman–Venetian War: The arrival of naval reinforcements and the news of the Battle of Petrovaradin force the Ottomans to abandon the Siege of Corfu, thus preserving the Ionian Islands under Venetian rule.
1770 – James Cook formally claims eastern Australia for Great Britain, naming it New South Wales.
1772 – King Gustav III completes his coup d'état by adopting a new Constitution, ending half a century of parliamentary rule in Sweden and installing himself as an enlightened despot.
1778 – American Revolutionary War: British forces begin besieging the French outpost at Pondichéry.
1791 – A Vodou ceremony, led by Dutty Boukman, turns into a violent slave rebellion, beginning the Haitian Revolution.
1808 – Battle of Vimeiro: British and Portuguese forces led by General Arthur Wellesley defeat French force under Major-General Jean-Andoche Junot near the village of Vimeiro, Portugal, the first Anglo-Portuguese victory of the Peninsular War.
1810 – Jean-Baptiste Bernadotte, Marshal of France, is elected Crown Prince of Sweden by the Swedish Riksdag of the Estates.
1821 – Jarvis Island is discovered by the crew of the ship, Eliza Frances.
1831 – Nat Turner leads black slaves and free blacks in a rebellion in Southampton County, Virginia, which will claim the lives of 55 to 65 whites and about twice that number of blacks.
1852 – Tlingit Indians destroy Fort Selkirk, Yukon Territory.
1858 – The first of the Lincoln–Douglas debates is held in Ottawa, Illinois.
1862 – The Stadtpark, the first public park in Vienna, opens to the public.
1863 – Lawrence, Kansas is destroyed by pro-Confederate guerrillas known as Quantrill's Raiders.
1878 – The American Bar Association is founded in Saratoga Springs, New York.
1879 – The locals of Knock, County Mayo, Ireland report their having seen an apparition of the Virgin Mary. The apparition is later named “Our Lady of Knock” and the spot transformed into a Catholic pilgrimage site.
1883 – An F5 tornado strikes Rochester, Minnesota, leading to the creation of the Mayo Clinic.
1888 – The first successful adding machine in the United States is patented by William Seward Burroughs.

1901–present
1901 – Six hundred American school teachers, Thomasites, arrived in Manila on the USAT Thomas.
1911 – The Mona Lisa is stolen by Vincenzo Peruggia, a Louvre employee.
1914 – World War I: The Battle of Charleroi, a successful German attack across the River Sambre that pre-empted a French offensive in the same area.
1918 – World War I: The Second Battle of the Somme begins.
1942 – World War II: The Guadalcanal Campaign: American forces defeat an attack by Imperial Japanese Army soldiers in the Battle of the Tenaru.
1944 – Dumbarton Oaks Conference, prelude to the United Nations, begins.
  1944   – World War II: Canadian and Polish units capture the strategically important town of Falaise, Calvados, France.
1945 – Physicist Harry Daghlian is fatally irradiated in a criticality accident during an experiment with the Demon core at Los Alamos National Laboratory.
1957 – The Soviet Union successfully conducts a long-range test flight of the R-7 Semyorka, the first intercontinental ballistic missile.
1959 – United States President Dwight D. Eisenhower signs an executive order proclaiming Hawaii the 50th state of the union. Hawaii's admission is currently commemorated by Hawaii Admission Day.
1963 – Xá Lợi Pagoda raids: The Army of the Republic of Vietnam Special Forces loyal to Ngô Đình Nhu, brother of President Ngo Dinh Diem, vandalizes Buddhist pagodas across the country, arresting thousands and leaving an estimated hundreds dead.
1965 – The Socialist Republic of Romania is proclaimed, following the adoption of a new constitution.
1968 – Cold War: Nicolae Ceaușescu, leader of the Socialist Republic of Romania, publicly condemns the Soviet-led Warsaw Pact invasion of Czechoslovakia, encouraging the Romanian population to arm itself against possible Soviet reprisals.
  1968   – James Anderson Jr. posthumously receives the first Medal of Honor to be awarded to an African American U.S. Marine.
1971 – A bomb exploded in the Liberal Party campaign rally in Plaza Miranda, Manila, Philippines with several anti-Marcos political candidates injured.
1982 – Lebanese Civil War: The first troops of a multinational force lands in Beirut to oversee the Palestine Liberation Organization's withdrawal from Lebanon.
1983 – Philippine opposition leader Benigno Aquino Jr. is assassinated at Manila International Airport (now renamed Ninoy Aquino International Airport in his honor).
1986 – Carbon dioxide gas erupts from volcanic Lake Nyos in Cameroon, killing up to 1,800 people within a 20-kilometer range.
1988 – The 6.9  Nepal earthquake shakes the Nepal–India border with a maximum Mercalli intensity of VIII (Severe), leaving 709–1,450 people killed and thousands injured.
1991 – Latvia declares renewal of its full independence after its occupation by the Soviet Union since 1940.
  1991   – Coup attempt against Mikhail Gorbachev collapses.
1993 – NASA loses contact with the Mars Observer spacecraft.
1994 – Royal Air Maroc Flight 630 crashes in Douar Izounine, Morocco, killing all 44 people on board.
1995 – Atlantic Southeast Airlines Flight 529, an Embraer EMB 120 Brasilia, attempts to divert to West Georgia Regional Airport after the left engine fails, but the aircraft crashes in Carroll County near Carrollton, Georgia, killing nine of the 29 people on board.
2000 – American golfer Tiger Woods wins the 82nd PGA Championship and becomes the first golfer since Ben Hogan in 1953 to win three majors in a calendar year.
2013 – Hundreds of people are reported killed by chemical attacks in the Ghouta region of Syria.
2017 – A solar eclipse traverses the continental United States.

Births

Pre-1600
1165 – Philip II of France (d. 1223)
1481 – Jorge de Lencastre, Duke of Coimbra (d. 1550)
1535 – Shimazu Yoshihiro, Japanese general (d. 1619)
1552 – Muhammad Qadiri, Founder of the Naushahia branch of the Qadri order (d. 1654)
1567 – Francis de Sales, Swiss bishop and saint (d. 1622)
1579 – Henri, Duke of Rohan (d. 1638)
1597 – Roger Twysden, English historian and politician (d. 1672)

1601–1900
1625 – John Claypole, English politician (d. 1688)
1643 – Afonso VI of Portugal (d. 1683)
1660 – Hubert Gautier, French mathematician and engineer (d. 1737)
1665 – Giacomo F. Maraldi, French-Italian astronomer and mathematician (d. 1729)
1670 – James FitzJames, 1st Duke of Berwick, French general and politician, Lord Lieutenant of Hampshire (d. 1734)
1725 – Jean-Baptiste Greuze, French painter and educator (d. 1805)
1754 – William Murdoch, Scottish engineer and inventor, created gas lighting (d. 1839)
  1754   – Banastre Tarleton, English general and politician (d. 1833)
1765 – William IV of the United Kingdom  (d. 1837)
1789 – Augustin-Louis Cauchy, French mathematician and academic (d. 1857)
1798 – Jules Michelet, French historian and philosopher (d. 1874)
1800 – Hiram Walden, American general and politician (d. 1880)
1801 – Guillaume Groen van Prinsterer, Dutch historian and politician (d. 1876)
1813 – Jean Stas, Belgian chemist and physician (d. 1891)
1816 – Charles Frédéric Gerhardt, French chemist and academic (d. 1856)
1823 – Nathaniel Everett Green, English painter and astronomer (d. 1899)
1826 – Karl Gegenbaur, German anatomist and academic (d. 1903)
1829 – Otto Goldschmidt, German composer, conductor and pianist (d. 1907)
1840 – Ferdinand Hamer, Dutch bishop and missionary (d. 1900)
1851 – Charles Barrois, French geologist and palaeontologist (d. 1939)
1856 – Medora de Vallombrosa, Marquise de Morès, American heiress (d. 1921)
1858 – Rudolf, Crown Prince of Austria, (d. 1889)
1862 – Emilio Salgari, Italian journalist and author (d. 1911)
1869 – William Henry Ogilvie, Scottish-Australian poet and author (d. 1963)
1872 – Aubrey Beardsley, English author and illustrator (d. 1898)
1878 – Richard Girulatis, German footballer and manager (d. 1963)
1879 – Claude Grahame-White, English pilot and engineer (d. 1959)
1884 – Chandler Egan, American golfer and architect (d. 1936)
1885 – Édouard Fabre, Canadian runner (d. 1939)
1886 – Ruth Manning-Sanders, Welsh-English author and poet (d. 1988)
1887 – James Paul Moody, English sailor (d. 1912)
1891 – Emiliano Mercado del Toro, Puerto Rican-American soldier (d. 2007)
1892 – Charles Vanel, French actor and director (d. 1989)
1894 – Christian Schad, German painter (d. 1982)
1895 – Blossom Rock, American actress (d. 1978)
1897 – Keith Arbuthnott, 15th Viscount of Arbuthnott, Scottish soldier and peer (d. 1966)

1901–present
1902 – Angel Karaliychev, Bulgarian author (d. 1972)
1903 – Kostas Giannidis, Greek pianist, composer, and conductor (d. 1984)
1904 – Count Basie, American pianist, composer, and bandleader (d. 1984)
1905 – Bipin Gupta, Indian actor and producer (d. 1981)
1906 – Friz Freleng, American animator, director, and producer (d. 1995)
1907 – P. Jeevanandham, Indian lawyer and politician (d. 1963)
1909 – Nikolay Bogolyubov, Russian mathematician and physicist (d. 1992)
1912 – Toe Blake, Canadian ice hockey player and coach (d. 1995)
1914 – Doug Wright, English cricketer and coach (d. 1998)
1916 – Bill Lee, American actor and singer (d. 1980)
  1916   – Consuelo Velázquez, Mexican pianist and songwriter (d. 2005)
1917 – Leonid Hurwicz, Russian economist and mathematician (d. 2008)
1918 – Billy Reay, Canadian-American ice hockey player and coach (d. 2004)
1921 – Reuven Feuerstein, Romanian-Israeli psychologist and academic (d. 2014)
1922 – Albert Irvin, English soldier and painter (d. 2015)
1923 – Keith Allen, Canadian-American ice hockey player, coach, and manager (d. 2014)
1924 – Jack Buck, American sportscaster (d. 2002)
  1924   – Jack Weston, American actor (d. 1996)
1926 – Can Yücel, Turkish poet and translator (d. 1999)
1927 – Thomas S. Monson, American religious leader, 16th President of The Church of Jesus Christ of Latter-day Saints (d. 2018)
1928 – Addison Farmer, American bassist (d. 1963)
  1928   – Art Farmer, American trumpet player and composer (d. 1999)
  1928   – Bud McFadin, American football player (d. 2006)
1929 – Herman Badillo, Puerto Rican-American lawyer and politician (d. 2014)
  1929   – X. J. Kennedy, American poet, translator, anthologist, editor
  1929   – Ahmed Kathrada, South African politician and political prisoner (d. 2017)
1930 – Princess Margaret, Countess of Snowdon (d. 2002)
  1930   – Frank Perry, American director, producer, and screenwriter (d. 1995)
1932 – Menashe Kadishman, Israeli sculptor and painter (d. 2015)
  1932   – Melvin Van Peebles, American actor, director, and screenwriter (d. 2021)
1933 – Janet Baker, English soprano and educator
  1933   – Michael Dacher, German mountaineer (d. 1994)
  1933   – Barry Norman, English author and critic (d. 2017)
  1933   – Erik Paaske, Danish actor and singer (d. 1992)
1934 – Sudhakarrao Naik, Indian lawyer and politician, 13th Chief Minister of Maharashtra (d. 2001)
  1934   – Paul Panhuysen, Dutch composer (d. 2015)
1936 – Wilt Chamberlain, American basketball player and coach (d. 1999)
  1936   – Radish Tordia, Georgian painter and educator
1937 – Donald Dewar, Scottish politician, first First Minister of Scotland (d. 2000)
  1937   – Gustavo Noboa, Ecuadorian academic and politician, 51st President of Ecuador (d. 2021)
  1937   – Robert Stone, American novelist and short story writer (d. 2015)
1938 – Kenny Rogers, American singer-songwriter, guitarist, producer, and actor (d. 2020)
  1938   – Mike Weston, English rugby player
1939 – James Burton, American Hall of Fame guitarist 
  1939   – Festus Mogae, Botswana economist and politician, third President of Botswana
  1939   – Clarence Williams III, American actor (d. 2021)
1940 – Dominick Harrod, English journalist, historian, and author (d. 2013)
  1940   – Endre Szemerédi, Hungarian-American mathematician and computer scientist
1941 – Jackie DeShannon, American singer-songwriter
1943 – Patrick Demarchelier, French photographer (d. 2022)
  1943   – Jonathan Schell, American journalist and author (d. 2014)
  1943   – Lucius Shepard, American author and critic (d. 2014)
  1943   – Hugh Wilson, American actor, director, producer, and screenwriter (d. 2018)
1944 – Perry Christie, Bahamian politician, third Prime Minister of the Bahamas
  1944   – Peter Weir, Australian director, producer, and screenwriter
1945 – Basil Poledouris, Greek-American composer, conductor (d. 2006)
  1945   – Celia Brayfield, English journalist and author
  1945   – Jerry DaVanon, American baseball player
  1945   – Willie Lanier, American football player
  1945   – Patty McCormack, American actress 
1947 – Carl Giammarese, American singer-songwriter and musician
1949 – Loretta Devine, American actress and singer
  1949   – Daniel Sivan, Israeli scholar and academic
1950 – Patrick Juvet, Swiss singer-songwriter and model
1951 – Eric Goles, Chilean mathematician and computer scientist
  1951   – Yana Mintoff, Maltese politician, economist and educator
  1951   – Chesley V. Morton, American businessman and politician
1952 – Keith Hart, Canadian firefighter, wrestler, and trainer
  1952   – Jiří Paroubek, Czech soldier and politician, sixth Prime Minister of the Czech Republic
  1952   – Bernadette Porter, English nun and educator 
  1952   – Joe Strummer, English singer-songwriter and guitarist (d. 2002)
1953 – Ivan Stang, American author, publisher, and director
1954 – Archie Griffin, American football player
  1954   – Steve Smith, American drummer
  1954   – Mark Williams, New Zealand-Australian singer-songwriter
1956 – Kim Cattrall, English-Canadian actress 
  1956   – Jon Tester, American farmer and politician
1957 – Frank Pastore, American baseball player and radio host (d. 2012)
1958 – Mark Williams, Australian footballer and coach
1959 – Anne Hobbs, English tennis player and coach
  1959   – Jim McMahon, American football player and coach
1961 – Gerardo Barbero, Argentinian chess player and coach (d. 2001)
  1961   – V. B. Chandrasekhar, Indian cricketer and coach (d. 2019)
  1961   – Stephen Hillenburg, American marine biologist, cartoonist, animator and creator of SpongeBob SquarePants (d. 2018)
1962 – John Korfas, Greek-American basketball player and coach
  1962   – Gilberto Santa Rosa, Puerto Rican bandleader and singer of salsa and bolero
  1962   – Pete Weber, American bowler
1963 – Mohammed VI of Morocco, King of Morocco
  1963   – Nigel Pearson, English footballer and manager
1964 – Gary Elkerton, Australian surfer
1965 – Jim Bullinger, American baseball player
1966 – John Wetteland, American baseball player and coach
1967 – Darren Bewick, Australian footballer
  1967   – Charb, French journalist and cartoonist (d. 2015)
  1967   – Carrie-Anne Moss, Canadian actress
  1967   – Serj Tankian, Lebanese-born Armenian-American singer-songwriter, multi-instrumentalist, and record producer 
1968 – Dina Carroll, English singer-songwriter
  1968   – Goran Ćurko, Serbian footballer
  1968   – Laura Trevelyan, English journalist and author
1969 – Bruce Anstey, New Zealand motorcycle racer
  1969   – Josée Chouinard, Canadian figure skater
1970 – Craig Counsell, American baseball player and coach
  1970   – Erik Dekker, Dutch cyclist and manager
  1970   – Cathy Weseluck, Canadian actress
1971 – Mamadou Diallo, Senegalese footballer
  1971   – Robert Harvey, Australian footballer and coach
  1971   – Liam Howlett, English keyboard player, DJ, and producer 
1973 – Sergey Brin, Russian-American computer scientist and businessman, co-founded Google
  1973   – Steve McKenna, Canadian ice hockey player and coach
1974 – Martin Andanar, Filipino journalist and radio host
  1974   – Paul Mellor, Australian rugby league player and referee
1975 – Simon Katich, Australian cricketer and manager
1976 – Alex Brooks, American ice hockey player and scout
  1976   – Jeff Cunningham, Jamaican-American soccer player
  1976   – Robert Miles, Australian rugby league player
  1976   – Ramón Vázquez, Puerto Rican-American baseball player and coach
1978 – Peter Buxton, English rugby player and manager
  1978   – Reuben Droughns, American football player and coach
  1978   – Lee Gronkiewicz, American baseball player and coach
  1978   – Alan Lee, Irish footballer and coach
  1978   – Jason Marquis, American baseball player
1979 – Kelis, American singer-songwriter, producer, chef and author
1980 – Burney Lamar, American race car driver
  1980   – Paul Menard, American race car driver
  1980   – Jasmin Wöhr, German tennis player
1981 – Jarrod Lyle, Australian golfer (d. 2018)
  1981   – Cameron Winklevoss, American rower and businessman, co-founded ConnectU
  1981   – Tyler Winklevoss, American rower and businessman, co-founded ConnectU
  1981   – Ross Thomas, American actor 
1982 – Jason Eaton, New Zealand rugby player
  1982   – Omar Sachedina, Canadian television journalist, correspondent, and news anchor
1983 – Scott McDonald, Australian footballer
1984 – Neil Dexter, South African cricketer
  1984   – Melvin Upton, Jr., American baseball player
1985 – Nicolás Almagro, Spanish tennis player
  1985   – Aleksandra Kiryashova, Russian pole vaulter
1986 – Usain Bolt, Jamaican sprinter
  1986   – Wout Brama, Dutch footballer
  1986   – Koki Sakamoto, Japanese gymnast
1988 – Robert Lewandowski, Polish footballer
  1988   – Kacey Musgraves, American singer-songwriter and guitarist
1989 – Charlison Benschop, Dutch footballer
  1989   – James Davey, English rugby league player
  1989   – Matteo Gentili, Italian footballer
  1989   – Hayden Panettiere, American actress
  1989   – Aleix Vidal, Spanish footballer
1990 – Bo Burnham, American comedian, musician, actor, filmmaker and poet
1991 – Leandro Bacuna, Dutch footballer
1992 – Felipe Nasr, Brazilian race car driver
1996 – Karolína Muchová, Czech tennis player

Deaths

Pre-1600
 672 – Emperor Kōbun of Japan (b. 648)
 784 – Alberic, archbishop of Utrecht
 913 – Tang Daoxi, Chinese general 
1131 – King Baldwin II of Jerusalem
1148 – William II, Count of Nevers (b. c. 1089)
1157 – Alfonso VII of León and Castile (b. 1105)
1245 – Alexander of Hales, English theologian
1271 – Alphonse, Count of Poitiers (b. 1220)
1534 – Philippe Villiers de L'Isle-Adam, 44th Grandmaster of the Knights Hospitaller (b. 1464)
1568 – Jean Parisot de Valette, 49th Grandmaster of the Knights Hospitaller (b. 1495)

1601–1900
1614 – Elizabeth Báthory, Hungarian countess and purported serial killer (b. 1560)
1622 – Juan de Tassis, 2nd Count of Villamediana, Spanish poet and politician (b. 1582)
1627 – Jacques Mauduit, French composer and academic (b. 1557)
1673 – Henry Grey, 1st Earl of Stamford, English soldier (b. 1599)
1689 – William Cleland, Scottish poet and soldier (b. 1661)
1762 – Lady Mary Wortley Montagu, English author, poet, and playwright (b. 1689)
1763 – Charles Wyndham, 2nd Earl of Egremont, English politician, Secretary of State for the Southern Department (b. 1710)
1775 – Zahir al-Umar, Arabian ruler (b. 1690)
1796 – John McKinly, American physician and politician, first Governor of Delaware (b. 1721)
1814 – Benjamin Thompson, American-English physicist and colonel (b. 1753)
1835 – John MacCulloch, Scottish geologist and academic (b. 1773)
1836 – Claude-Louis Navier, French physicist and engineer (b. 1785)
1838 – Adelbert von Chamisso, German botanist and poet (b. 1781)
1853 – Charles Tristan, marquis de Montholon, French general (b. 1783)
1854 – Thomas Clayton, American lawyer and politician (b. 1777)
1867 – Juan Álvarez, Mexican general and president (1855) (b. 1790)
1870 – Ma Xinyi, Chinese general and politician, Viceroy of Liangjiang (b. 1821)
1888 – James Farnell, Australian politician, eighth Premier of New South Wales (b. 1825)

1901–present
1905 – Alexander von Oettingen, Estonian theologian and statistician (b. 1827)
1910 – Bertalan Székely, Hungarian painter and academic (b. 1835)
1911 – Mahboob Ali Khan, sixth Nizam of Hyderabad State (b.1866)
1919 – Laurence Doherty, English tennis player (b. 1875)
1935 – John Hartley, English tennis player (b. 1849)
1940 – Hermann Obrecht, Swiss lawyer and politician (b. 1882)
  1940   – Ernest Thayer, American poet and author (b. 1863)
  1940   – Leon Trotsky, Russian theorist and politician, founded the Red Army (b. 1879)
1943 – Henrik Pontoppidan, Danish journalist and author, Nobel Prize laureate (b. 1857)
1947 – Ettore Bugatti, Italian-French engineer and businessman, founded Bugatti (b. 1881)
1951 – Constant Lambert, English composer and conductor (b. 1905)
1957 – Mait Metsanurk, Estonian author and playwright (b. 1879)
  1957   – Nels Stewart, Canadian ice hockey player (b. 1902)
  1957   – Harald Sverdrup, Norwegian meteorologist and oceanographer (b. 1888)
1960 – David B. Steinman, American engineer, designed the Mackinac Bridge (b. 1886)
1964 – Palmiro Togliatti, Italian journalist and politician, Italian Minister of Justice (b. 1893)
1968 – Germaine Guèvremont, Canadian journalist and author (b. 1893)
1971 – George Jackson, American activist and author, co-founded the Black Guerrilla Family (b. 1941)
1974 – Buford Pusser, American police officer (b. 1937)
  1974   – Kirpal Singh, Indian spiritual master (b. 1894)
1978 – Charles Eames, American architect, co-designed the Eames House (b. 1907)
1979 – Giuseppe Meazza, Italian footballer and manager (b. 1910)
1981 – Kaka Kalelkar, Indian Hindi Writer(B.1885)
1983 – Benigno Aquino Jr., Filipino journalist and politician (b. 1932)
1988 – Teodoro de Villa Diaz, Filipino guitarist and songwriter (b. 1963)
  1988   – Ray Eames, American architect, co-designed the Eames House (b. 1912)
1989 – Raul Seixas, Brazilian singer-songwriter and producer (b. 1945)
1993 – Tatiana Troyanos, American soprano and actress (b. 1938)
1995 – Subrahmanyan Chandrasekhar, Indian-American astrophysicist and mathematician, Nobel Prize laureate (b. 1910)
  1995   – Chuck Stevenson, American race car driver (b. 1919)
1996 – Mary Two-Axe Earley, Canadian indigenous women's rights activist (b. 1911)
2000 – Tomata du Plenty, American singer-songwriter and playwright (b. 1948)
  2000   – Daniel Lisulo, Zambian politician, third Prime Minister of Zambia (b. 1930)
  2000   – Andrzej Zawada, Polish mountaineer and author (b. 1928)
2001 – Calum MacKay, Canadian ice hockey player (b. 1927)
2003 – John Coplans, British artist (b. 1920)
  2003   – Kathy Wilkes, English philosopher and academic (b. 1946)
2004 – Sachidananda Routray, Indian Oriya-language poet (b. 1916)
2005 – Martin Dillon, American tenor and educator (b. 1957)
  2005   – Robert Moog, American businessman, founded Moog Music (b. 1934)
  2005   – Dahlia Ravikovitch, Israeli poet and translator (b. 1936)
2005 – Marcus Schmuck, Austrian mountaineer (b. 1925)
2006 – Bismillah Khan, Indian musician, Bharat Ratna recipient (b. 1916)
2006 – Paul Fentener van Vlissingen, Dutch businessman and philanthropist (b. 1941)
2007 – Frank Bowe, American academic (b. 1947)
  2007   – Siobhan Dowd, British author (b. 1960)
  2007   – Elizabeth P. Hoisington, American general (b. 1918)
2008 – Jerry Finn, American engineer and producer (b. 1969)
2009 – Rex Shelley, Singaporean engineer and author (b. 1930)
2010 – Rodolfo Enrique Fogwill, Argentinean sociologist and author (b. 1941)
2012 – Georg Leber, German soldier and politician, Federal Minister of Defence for Germany (b. 1920)
  2012   – J. Frank Raley Jr., American soldier and politician (b. 1926)
  2012   – Don Raleigh, Canadian ice hockey player and coach (b. 1926)
  2012   – Guy Spitaels, Belgian academic and politician, seventh Minister-President of Wallonia (b. 1931)
  2012   – William Thurston, American mathematician and academic (b. 1946)
2013 – Jean Berkey, American lawyer and politician (b. 1938)
  2013   – Sid Bernstein, American record producer (b. 1918)
  2013   – C. Gordon Fullerton, American colonel, engineer, and astronaut (b. 1936)
  2013   – Fred Martin, Scottish footballer (b. 1929)
  2013   – Enos Nkala, Zimbabwean politician, Zimbabwean Minister of Defence (b. 1932)
2014 – Gerry Anderson, Irish radio and television host (b. 1944)
  2014   – Helen Bamber, English psychotherapist and academic (b. 1925)
  2014   – Steven R. Nagel, American colonel, engineer, and astronaut (b. 1946)
  2014   – Jean Redpath, Scottish singer-songwriter (b. 1937)
  2014   – Albert Reynolds, Irish businessman and politician, ninth Taoiseach of Ireland (b. 1932)
2015 – Colin Beyer, New Zealand lawyer and businessman (b. 1938)
  2015   – Wang Dongxing, Chinese commander and politician (b. 1916)
  2015   – Jimmy Evert, American tennis player and coach (b. 1924)
2017 – Bajram Rexhepi, First Kosovan Prime Ministers of UN mission administration in Kosovo (b. 1954)
2018 – Stefán Karl Stefánsson, Icelandic actor and singer (b. 1975)
2019 – Celso Piña, Mexican singer, composer, arranger, and accordionist (b. 1953)

Holidays and observances
 Christian Feast Day:
 Abraham of Smolensk (Eastern Orthodox Church)
 Euprepius of Verona
 Maximilian of Antioch
 Our Lady of Knock
 Pope Pius X
 Sidonius Apollinaris
 August 21 (Eastern Orthodox liturgics)
 Ninoy Aquino Day (Philippines)
 Youth Day (Morocco)
 World Senior Citizen's Day

References

External links

 
 
 

Days of the year
August